Arthur Harrison Wilson (1881–1953) was an officer in the United States Army and a Medal of Honor recipient for his actions in the Philippine Insurrection. Originally a member of the West Point class of 1903, he was held back a year and graduated in 1904. He was the captain of the world champion West Point Polo Team, and served a long career in the Cavalry. He was a full colonel and commander of Fort Brown, Texas, when he retired in 1942 after almost 40 years service. He lived the remaining 11 years of his life in retirement at Brownsville, Texas. He died of cardiac failure while duck hunting, one of his favorite sports.

Medal of Honor citation
Rank and organization: Second Lieutenant, 6th U.S. Cavalry. Place and date: At Patian Island, Philippine Islands, July 4, 1909. Entered service at: Springfield, Ill. Birth: Springfield, Ill. Date of issue: Unknown.

Citation:

While in action against hostile Moros, when, it being necessary to secure a mountain gun in position by rope and tackle, voluntarily with the assistance of an enlisted man, carried the rope forward and fastened it, being all the time under heavy fire of the enemy at short range.

See also

List of Philippine–American War Medal of Honor recipients

References

External links

1881 births
United States Army Medal of Honor recipients
United States Army colonels
People from Springfield, Illinois
American military personnel of the Philippine–American War
1953 deaths
Philippine–American War recipients of the Medal of Honor
Military personnel from Illinois